Mikayla Morrison (born 1 March 2002) is an Australian rules footballer playing for the Fremantle Football Club in the AFL Women's (AFLW).

Morrison was drafted by Fremantle with their second selection, and 30th overall in the 2020 AFL Women's draft. As a junior she represented WA at the National Under 18s Championships in 2019, and was selected to be in the AFL Women's National Academy.

After not playing a game in her first season, she made her debut in the 4th round of the 2022 AFL Women's season. In her third game, and first at home at Fremantle Oval, Morrison was one of Fremantle's best players, kicking 3 goals and receiving the weekly nomination for the 2022 AFL Women's Rising Star award.

References

External links 

WAFL playing statistics

2002 births
Living people
Fremantle Football Club (AFLW) players
Australian rules footballers from Western Australia
Indigenous Australian players of Australian rules football